This is a complete list of ice hockey players who were drafted in the National Hockey League Entry Draft by the Dallas Stars. It includes every player who was drafted, regardless of whether they played for the team. It does not include Minnesota North Stars draft picks.

Key
 Played at least one game with the Stars
 Spent entire NHL career with the Stars

Draft picks
Statistics are complete as of the 2021–22 NHL season and show each player's career regular season totals in the NHL.  Wins, losses, ties, overtime losses and goals against average apply to goaltenders and are used only for players at that position.

See also
List of Minnesota North Stars draft picks

References
General
 
 
Specific

 
draft picks
Dallas Stars